Forum Julium may refer to the following Ancient Roman places:

 the Forum of Caesar, a major square in Rome
 the settlement Illiturgis, in southern Iberia (Spain)

See also
 Forum Iulii (disambiguation)